Jesús Emilio Díez de Mier (born 7 January 1973), known as Txutxi, is a Spanish retired footballer who played as a central defender.

He appeared in 304 Segunda División games during 11 seasons, mainly in representation of Bilbao Athletic and Badajoz. In La Liga, he played with Athletic Bilbao.

Football career
Born in Bilbao, Biscay, Txutxi joined Athletic Bilbao's youth system at the age of 17. He spent four full seasons competing with the reserves in Segunda División, being relegated in 1996; on 22 October 1992, he made his debut for the main squad, playing the full 90 minutes in a 0–1 away loss against Xerez CD for the Copa del Rey.

Txutxi first appeared in La Liga courtesy of manager Dragoslav Stepanović – exactly three years after his first competitive match – a 0–0 home draw to RCD Español in which he again played the entire game. After leaving the Basques he resumed his career in the second level, with UE Lleida and CD Badajoz, eventually becoming team captain at the latter.

In December 2001, Txutxi signed for Segunda División B club Hércules CF. He retired in June 2005 aged 32, after a spell with amateurs Sangonera Atlético CF.

Drug scandal
In February 2009 Txutxi, alongside former footballers Carlos de la Vega and Predrag Stanković, was arrested in connection with an anti-drug operation in Madrid. Both he and Stanković were condemned to nine years in 2014 (confirmation in 2015) – as five other people received sentences that ranged from four to 12 years, with de la Vega being one of two persons acquitted – for smuggling 950 kg of cocaine into the country.

References

External links
Athletic Bilbao profile 

1973 births
Living people
Spanish footballers
Footballers from Bilbao
Association football defenders
La Liga players
Segunda División players
Segunda División B players
Tercera División players
CD Getxo players
Bilbao Athletic footballers
Athletic Bilbao footballers
UE Lleida players
CD Badajoz players
Hércules CF players
Yeclano CF players
People convicted of drug offenses